The Air Training Corps (ATC) is a cadet organisation based in the United Kingdom. It is a voluntary youth group which is part of the Royal Air Force Air Cadets. The ATC is largely composed of individual units known as squadrons. These squadrons are organised into several different wings, which in turn are organised into six different regions. Together the regions make up the corps.

Headquarters air cadets (HQAC) is located at Royal Air Force College Cranwell, Lincolnshire and headed by Commandant Air Cadets Air Commodore Tony Keeling OBE.

Founder squadrons and detached flights 
The first 50 squadrons formed have their squadron numbers followed by an F to show they are "founder" squadrons (e.g. No 2F(Watford) Squadron). Only 30 are still in existence, as the other 20 have disbanded over time. Founder squadrons that have reformed after being disbanded do not retain the F status, such as XIX (19) Crawley .

In towns not large enough to sustain a squadron of 30 cadets, or as a supplement to an existing squadron in a larger town or city, a detached flight may be formed. This operates much like any other unit, but is technically a component part of a nearby larger squadron. There are currently approximately 48 detached flights, denoted by the letters "DF" after a squadron number.

Central & east region 
Region HQ RAF Wyton

Bedfordshire & Cambridgeshire wing 

Wing HQ RAF Wyton

Hertfordshire & Buckinghamshire wing 
Wing HQ RAF Halton

Norfolk & Suffolk wing 
Wing HQ Norwich

South & East Midlands wing 
Wing HQ RAF Wittering

Trent wing 
Wing HQ RAF Digby

Essex wing 
Wing HQ RFCA Chelmsford

London & South East region 

Region HQ RAF Northolt

Kent wing 
Wing HQ Maidstone

London wing 
Wing HQ (shared London, Middlesex, Surrey WHQ)

Middlesex wing 
Wing HQ RAF Northolt

Surrey wing 
Wing HQ (merged WHQ with London & Middlesex)

Sussex wing 
Wing HQ Seaford

North region 

Region HQ RAF Leeming

Central & East Yorkshire wing 
Wing HQ RAF Topcliffe

Cumbria & Lancashire wing 
Formerly Cumbria and North Lancashire wing, merged with East Lancashire wing in 2011
Wing HQ Inskip

Durham & Northumberland wing 
Wing HQ Knightsbridge, Gosforth, Newcastle upon Tyne

Greater Manchester wing 
Wing HQ University Barracks Manchester

 2056 (Knutsford)

Merseyside wing 
Wing HQ RAF Woodvale

South & West Yorkshire wing 
Wing HQ Castleford

South West region 

Region HQ Devizes

Bristol & Gloucestershire wing 
Wing HQ RAF Quedgeley

Devon & Somerset wing 
Wing HQ Wyvern Barracks

Dorset & Wiltshire wing 
Wing HQ MoD Boscombe Down

Hampshire & Isle of Wight wing 
Wing HQ Newburgh House, Winchester

Plymouth & Cornwall wing 
Wing HQ RAF St Mawgan

Thames Valley wing 
Wing HQ Edward Brooks Barracks

Wales & West region 

Region HQ RAF Cosford

Staffordshire wing 
Wing HQ RAF Cosford

West Mercian wing 
Wing HQ RAF Cosford

Number 1 Welsh wing 
Wing HQ Maindy Barracks, Cardiff

Number 2 Welsh wing 
Wing HQ Queensferry TA Centre

Number 3 Welsh wing 
Wing HQ The Grange, Swansea

Warwickshire & Birmingham wing 
Wing HQ Coventry (Army Reserve Centre Canley)

Scotland & Northern Ireland region 

Region HQ Leuchars Station

With effect from the 1st of February 2021, Scotland and Northern Ireland will be restructured and encompass the following Wings;

 North Scotland wing (merger of Highland and North East Scotland wings)
 Central Scotland wing (merger of select units from North East and South East Scotland wings)
 South East Scotland wing (with modified footprint)
 West Scotland wing (with modified footprint)
 Northern Ireland wing (no change)

North Scotland wing 
Wing HQ RAF Lossiemouth

Central Scotland wing 
Wing HQ Leuchars Station

South East Scotland wing 
Wing HQ Leuchars Station (A new Wing HQ, and new Wing HQ permanent staff, is being established within Redford Barracks, Edinburgh)

West Scotland wing 
Wing HQ Paisley Cadet Centre

Northern Ireland wing 
Wing HQ JHC FS Aldergrove

See also 
List of squadrons in the New Zealand ATC

References

External links 
 
 Air Cadets - Find a squadron
 Air Cadets (ATC) Squadron Finder - a searchable list of all ATC Squadrons by location and postcode providing Squadron and Wing contact details
 

ATC
Air Training Corps